Zirconium acetylacetonate is the coordination complex with the formula Zr(C5H7O2)4. It is a common acetylacetonate of zirconium. It is a white solid that exhibits high solubility in nonpolar organic solvents, but not simple hydrocarbons.

The complex is prepared by treating zirconium oxychloride with acetylacetone:
ZrOCl2 + 4 Hacac → Zr(acac)4 + 2 HCl  +  H2O

The complex has a square antiprismatic geometry with eight nearly equivalent Zr-O bonds of length 2.19 Å.  The molecular symmetry is D2, i.e. the complex is chiral. Compounds of high coordination number tend to be stereochemically nonrigid as indicated by the observation of one methyl signal by proton NMR spectroscopy.

More volatile than Zr(acac)4 is the related complex of 1,1,1-trifluoroacetylacetonate.

References

Zirconium(IV) compounds
Acetylacetonate complexes